Nora E. Vargas (born 1970/1971) is an American politician serving as a member of the San Diego County Board of Supervisors from District 1 since 2021. She was elected Chair on January 10, 2023. She is the first immigrant and first Latina elected to the body.

Early life and education
Vargas was born in Tijuana, Mexico, and grew up in Southern San Diego County. She graduated from Montgomery High School then attended Southwestern College before transferring to the University of San Francisco where she earned a Bachelor's degree in politics. and graduate work in women's studies from Claremont Graduate University.

She has worked at various non-profit organizations and was Vice President of community and governmental relations at Planned Parenthood of the Pacific Southwest. Governor Jerry Brown appointed her to the California State Teachers' Retirement System in 2015 and she served on the Southwestern College board.

San Diego County Board of Supervisors
Vargas was elected to succeed longtime District 1 Supervisor Greg Cox in 2020, defeating State Senator Ben Hueso in the general election. The district includes Chula Vista, Coronado, and National City as well as the San Diego communities of Barrio Logan, San Ysidro, and Otay. She was sworn in on January 4, 2021, and selected to be Vice Chair of the Council.

Electoral history

References

External links
Official Campaign Website
Supervisor Nora Vargas Official Website

Living people
21st-century American politicians
21st-century American women politicians
California Democrats
Politicians from San Diego
San Diego County Board of Supervisors members
Hispanic and Latino American women in politics
American politicians of Mexican descent
Politicians from Tijuana
1970 births